Ciudad Libertad Airport  is a defunct airport near Havana, Cuba. and formerly known as El Aeropuerto de Columbia. Located in the borough of Playa, it was Cuba's main airport until 1930, when it was replaced by José Martí International Airport. The airport was also the location of the 1960 Cuban Grand Prix. Two days prior to the Bay of Pigs Invasion in 1961 the airport was bombed by US planes.  It previously had two runways, but only one remains. It is now a school.

Facilities

References

Airports in Cuba
Transport in Havana
Buildings and structures in Havana